The 1990–91 Kent Football League season was the 25th in the history of the Kent Football League, a football competition in England.

The league was won by Sittingbourne, who was promoted to the Southern Football League after leaving it in 1967.

League table

The league featured 20 clubs which competed in the previous season, along with one new club:
Sheppey United, relegated from the Southern League

League table

References

External links

1990-91
1990–91 in English football leagues